The peppered shiner or colorless shiner (Notropis perpallidus) is a species of ray-finned fish in the family Cyprinidae.
It is endemic to the United States where it is found in the Red and Ouachita river drainages in southeastern Oklahoma and southern Arkansas.

References 

 

perpallidus
Fish described in 1940
Taxa named by Carl Leavitt Hubbs
Taxa named by John D. Black (ichthyologist)
Taxonomy articles created by Polbot
Red River of the South